Milica Jelić (born 1990) is a beauty queen who represented  Serbia in Miss World 2010 in Sanya, China. She competed in the contest for the Miss Serbia 2009 and entered the top 10. Her ambitions are to become a successful journalist. She dealt with the Latin-American dance, volleyball and swimming.

References

External links
Miss Serbia 2010
Milica Jelic
Milica interview on Serbian

Miss World 2010 delegates
Miss Serbia winners
1990 births
Living people
Models from Belgrade
Serbian beauty pageant winners